Agios Vasileios (Greek for Saint Basil) may refer to the following places:

In Greece
 Agios Vasileios, Rethymno, a municipality near Rethymno, Crete
 Agios Vasileios, Archanes-Asterousia, a village in the municipality Archanes-Asterousia, Heraklion regional unit, Crete
 Agios Vasileios, Viannos, a village in the municipality Viannos, Heraklion regional unit, Crete
 Agios Vasileios, Achaea, a village near Patras
 Agios Vasileios, Corinthia, a village near Corinth
 Agios Vasileios, Laconia, site of a Mycenaean palace
 Agios Vasileios, a village in the municipality East Mani
 Agios Vasileios, Mount Athos, a hermitage in Mount Athos

In Cyprus
 Agios Vasileios, Cyprus